Sandy Bend is an unincorporated community in Cowlitz County, Washington, south of the city of Castle Rock, west of Washington State Route 411, and to the west of the Cowlitz River. Sandy Bend is located along or near Sandy Bend Road between Castle Rock and West Side Highway. The Sandy Bend community is part of the Castle Rock School District, a K-12 school district of about 1,300 students.

Geography
Sandy Bend is located at  (46.2406671, -122.9140023).

External links
Castle Rock School District website

References

Unincorporated communities in Cowlitz County, Washington
Unincorporated communities in Washington (state)